Myrmecodia beccarii, ant-house plant, is an epiphytic plant on Melaleuca trees and others with spongy bark in the wetlands and mangroves of tropical north Queensland, Australia from Cooktown to Mission Beach. The prickly, swollen stems develop natural hollows which are invaded by the golden ant (Iridomyrmex cordatus) in a symbiotic arrangement. The ants patrol the plant, removing leaf-eaters, while their excreta is absorbed by the plant for nutrition.

The flowers are white and tubular, to 10 mm, and the fruit is white/translucent containing a single seed. These seeds are transported to other trees by the mistletoebird (Dicaeum hirundinaceum).

The Apollo jewel butterfly (Hypochrysops apollo apollo) lays its eggs on the plant, and because they smell like ant's eggs, the ants carry the eggs inside the plant, where they develop to the butterfly stage. Hypochrysops is a genus of "blues", butterflies in the family Lycaenidae, which is notorious for its myrmecophily. Accordingly, it is likely that the larvae that hatch from the eggs feed either on food begged from the ants, or on ant larvae, or possibly both. In either event, the butterfly finally emerges and flies off.

References

External links

Myrmecophytes
Epiphytes
Endemic flora of Australia
Flora of Queensland
Psychotrieae